The Battle of the Alte Veste was a significant battle of the Thirty Years' War.

Background
In the late summer of 1632 the army of Swedish King Gustavus Adolphus met Albrecht von Wallenstein near Nürnberg.  The successes of Gustavus Adolphus over General Tilly forced Holy Roman Emperor Ferdinand II to recall Albrecht von Wallenstein into military service from retirement.  Wallenstein was unmatched in his ability to raise troops, and within a few weeks he took to the field with a fresh army.

The Imperial Army's ranks swelled as Wallenstein moved to stop the Swedes' advance at Nuremberg.  Repeatedly, Gustav Adolf formed for battle and challenged Wallenstein to come out of his fortified camp, but was refused.  As the supply situation continued to worsen, the impetuous King grew desperate.

Battle
Gustavus Adolphus attacked the Imperial camp at the Alte Veste (or "Old Fortress")—a derelict castle situated atop a wooded hill.  Its ownership would then allow the Swedish guns to dominate the Imperial camp. The Imperials were prepared with trenches and an abatis that stymied the Swedish advance.  When the vaunted brigades faltered, much of the cavalry was sent in dismounted. Wallenstein saw an opportunity to strike a blow and sallied his cavalry and cut down many of the exhausted troops.  Only the final introduction of the Swedish cavalry reserve averted a complete disaster.

Result
The Swedes had been defeated. The Commander of the Swedish artillery, Lennart Torstenson, was taken prisoner and locked up for nearly a year at Ingolstadt. Several weeks later, lack of supplies led Wallenstein to break camp and move north, allowing the Swedes out of Nuremberg. The two armies met again two months later at the Battle of Lützen, where Gustavus was killed.

Citations

References

External links

Alte Veste
1632 in Europe
Alte Veste 1632
Alte Veste 1632
Alte Veste 1632
1632 in the Holy Roman Empire
Events in Nuremberg
Gustavus Adolphus of Sweden
Albrecht von Wallenstein
Alte Veste